There are 292 scheduled monuments in County Durham, in North East England. These protected sites date from the Neolithic period and include barrows, a medieval hospital, ancient Roman sites, castle ruins, Iron Age forts, bridges and Anglo-Saxon crosses.
In the United Kingdom, the scheduling of monuments was first initiated to insure the preservation of "nationally important" archaeological sites or historic buildings. The protection given to scheduled monuments is given under the Ancient Monuments and Archaeological Areas Act 1979

Notable scheduled monuments in County Durham

See also
List of scheduled monuments
List of World Heritage Sites in the United Kingdom

References

Scheduled monuments in County Durham